The statue of Álex Lora is installed in the city of Puebla, in the Mexican state of Puebla.

References

External links

 

Lora
Lora
Monuments and memorials in Puebla
Musical instruments in art
Outdoor sculptures in Puebla (city)
Lora
Statues in Puebla
Lora